Calamus radicalis, commonly known as vicious hairy mary, is a plant in the palm family Arecaceae endemic to the rainforests of north east Queensland, Australia. Like other species in the genus Calamus, this is a climbing plant with a very long and flexible stem. It uses sharp strong hooks on the fronds and tendrils to attach itself to other vegetation, such as taller established trees, thus gaining support that enables it to grow higher towards the canopy. This species is very similar to C. australis, with which it coexists, but is larger in almost all respects.

Description
This species has a clustering habit, i.e. several stems are produced from the same base. The leaves (or fronds) are produced on the youngest part of the stem, and the older sections are bare as the leaves age and fall off (exactly the same process as the more familiar upright palm with a stout stem). The older, leafless part of the stem of Calamus radicalis is smooth and glossy green.

Tendrils, measuring several metres in length and armed with many large, stout, recurved barbs are produced from the leaf sheath. Leaves are armed with stout recurved barbs on both upper and lower surfaces of the rachis, and with fine, short -  - spines on the upper surface of the leaflets.

The inflorescences are large pendulous panicles measuring several metres in length, carrying either staminate (functionally male) or pistillate (functionally female) flowers.

Fruits are globose, around  diameter, with a scaly exterior. They contain a single round seed which is surrounded by a thin layer of soft edible flesh.

Taxonomy
Calamus radicalis was first described in 1875 by Hermann Wendland and Carl Georg Oscar Drude in their work Palmae Australasicae, published in the journal Linnaea: Ein Journal für die Botanik in ihrem ganzen Umfange, oder Beiträge zur Pflanzenkunde. The type specimen was collected near the Russell River in Queensland.

Distribution and habitat
This species is restricted to the area from Cape Tribulation southwards to near Mackay. It grows in well developed lowland and highland rainforest, reaching its best development on soils derived from volcanic rocks.

Conservation
This species is listed by the Queensland Department of Environment and Science as least concern. , it has not been assessed by the IUCN.

Gallery

References

External links
 
 
 View a map of historical sightings of this species at the Australasian Virtual Herbarium
 View observations of this species on iNaturalist
 View images of this species on Flickriver

radicalis
Endemic flora of Queensland
Taxa named by Hermann Wendland
Taxa named by Carl Georg Oscar Drude
Plants described in 1875